Lasjia whelanii, also known as Whelan's silky oak, Whelan's nut oak or Whelan's macadamia, is a species of large forest tree in the protea family that is endemic to north-eastern Queensland, Australia.

History
The tree was first described in 1889 by Queensland's colonial botanist Frederick Manson Bailey as a species of Helicia, which in 1901 he moved to Macadamia, but was transferred in 2008, in a paper in the American Journal of Botany by Peter Weston and Austin Mast, to the new genus Lasjia.

Description
The dark green leaves are 6–21.5 cm long by 2–6.5 cm wide, with four or five leaves in each whorl. The white flowers grow as inflorescences. The globular fruits are 4–5 cm in diameter, with the seeds strongly cyanogenetic (cyanide producing) and poisonous to humans. It produces a useful timber, suitable for construction work.

Distribution and habitat
The species occurs in the Wet Tropics of Queensland, in well-developed lowland tropical rainforest, from near sea level to an altitude of 650 m.

References

whelanii
Flora of Queensland
Endemic flora of Australia
Proteales of Australia
Taxa named by Frederick Manson Bailey
Plants described in 1889